All About Us may refer to:

Film and television
 All About Us (TV series), a 2001 American teen sitcom
 All About Us: Living and Growing, a British Sex and Relationships Education video series
 All About Us, a 2007 film featuring LaTanya Richardson

Music
 All About Us (musical), by Kander and Ebb
 "All About Us" (Peter Andre song), 1997
 "All About Us" (t.A.T.u. song), 2005
 "All About Us", a song by He Is We from My Forever, 2010
 "All About Us", a song by Jordan Fisher, 2016